Phoenix Gold Mine, Idaho Springs, Colorado is a fully operational gold mine where there are tours replete with opportunities to pan for gold. Since 1988, Phoenix Gold Mine has been family owned and operated. The Mosch family is "the oldest continuous mining family in the state" of Colorado. Phoenix Gold Mine has been featured on the Discovery Channel and the Travel Channel.

References

Gold mining in Colorado
Underground mines in the United States
1988 establishments in Colorado
Denver metropolitan area
Tourist attractions in Colorado